An election exit poll is a poll of voters taken immediately after they have exited the polling stations. A similar poll conducted before actual voters have voted is called an entrance poll. Pollsters – usually private companies working for newspapers or broadcasters – conduct exit polls to gain an early indication as to how an election has turned out, as in many elections the actual result may take hours to count.

History
There are different views on who invented the exit poll. Marcel van Dam, Dutch sociologist and former politician, says he was the inventor, by being the first to implement one during the Dutch legislative elections on February 15, 1967. Other sources say Warren Mitofsky, an American pollster, was the first. For CBS News, he devised an exit poll in the Kentucky gubernatorial election in November that same year. Not withstanding this, the mention of the first exit polls date back to the 1940s when such a poll was held in Denver, Colorado.

Purpose

Exit polls are also used to collect demographic data about voters and to find out why they voted as they did. Since actual votes are cast anonymously, polling is the only way of collecting this information.

Exit polls have historically and throughout the world been used as a check against, and rough indicator of, the degree of election fraud. Some examples of this include the 2004 Venezuelan recall referendum, and the 2004 Ukrainian presidential election.

They are used to command a mandate as well as to determine whether or not a particular political campaign was successful or not.

Methods

The distribution of votes is not even across different polling stations, and also varies at different times of day. As a result, a single exit poll may give an imperfect picture of the national vote. Instead, some exit polls  calculate swing and turnout. Pollsters return to the same polling stations at the same times at each election, and by comparing the results with previous exit polls they can calculate how the distribution of votes has changed in that constituency. This swing is then applied to other similar constituencies, allowing an estimate of how national voting patterns have changed. The polling locations are chosen to cover the entire gamut of society and where possible, to include especially critical marginal seats. Data is presented in one of three ways, either as a table, graph or written interpretation.

US exit polls have long been conducted by Edison Research for the National Election Pool of media organizations, interviewing a sample of voters as they leave a polling place. These pollsters choose precincts whose mix of voters is representative of the broader area. These voters may not be typical. For example minority voters in a mixed precinct may vote at different rates and for different candidates than minority voters in a mostly minority precinct. The Associated Press since 2018 has switched to phone polling, which does not need to be grouped by precinct. They start calling a random sample of voters until they vote, to cover mailed ballots, early voting, and election day voting.

Problems
Like all opinion polls, exit polls by nature do include a margin of error. A famous example of exit poll error occurred in the 1992 UK General Election, when two exit polls predicted a hung parliament. The actual vote revealed that Conservative Party Government under John Major held their position, though with a significantly reduced majority. Investigations into this failure identified a number of causes including differential response rates (the Shy Tory Factor), the use of inadequate demographic data and poor choice of sampling points.

Because exit polls require a baseline to compare swing against, they are not reliable for one-off votes such as the Scottish independence referendum or the UK EU membership referendum. Because exit polls can't reach people who voted by postal ballot or another form of absentee voting, they may be biased towards certain demographics and miss swings that only occur among absentee voters. For example, in the May round of the 2016 Austrian presidential election, exit polls correctly pointed to a narrow lead for Norbert Hofer among those who voted at a polling station. However, the postal votes (which made up about 12% of the total vote) were slightly but definitively in favour of his rival Alexander Van der Bellen, and ultimately gave Van der Bellen victory. This could be considered a non-U.S. example of the phenomenon known as "blue shift" in the U.S.

Organizations that conduct election exit polling
In the United States, the National Election Pool (NEP), consisting of ABC, AP, CBS, CNN, Fox News, and NBC, conducts a joint election exit poll. Since 2004 this exit poll has been conducted for the NEP by Edison Media Research.  Edison uses probability-based sampling.  In 2020, in-person interviews on Election Day were conducted at a random sample of 115 polling locations nationwide among 7,774 Election Day voters. The results also include 4,919 telephone interviews with early and absentee voters.

The release of exit poll data in the US is controlled. In the 2012 election protocols to quarantine the release of data were put in place.

In Egypt, the Egyptian center for public opinion research (baseera) conducted in 2014 two exit polls; the constitution referendum exit poll and the presidency elections exit polls.

In South Korea, KBS, SBS, and MBC conducted a joint exit poll to decide the president of the country.

In India, the exit polls are conducted by private news broadcasting channels and newspaper agencies such as The Times Group, CVoter, India Today, etc. India being the largest democracy in the world has many agencies publishing exit polls which roughly predict the outcome of the elections.

Criticism and controversy
Widespread criticism of exit polling has occurred in cases, especially in the United States, where exit-poll results have appeared and/or have provided a basis for projecting winners before all real polls have closed, thereby possibly influencing election results. States have tried and failed to restrict exit polling; however, it is protected by the First Amendment. In the 1980 US presidential election, NBC predicted a victory for Ronald Reagan at 8:15 pm EST, based on exit polls of 20,000 voters. It was 5:15 pm on the West Coast, and the polls were still open. There was speculation that voters stayed away after hearing the results. Thereafter, television networks have voluntarily adopted the policy of not projecting any victor within a state until all polls have closed for that state.  In the 2000 US presidential election it was alleged that media organizations released exit poll results for Florida before the polls closed in the Republican-leaning counties of the panhandle, as part of the westernmost area of the state is one hour behind the main peninsula. A study by economist John Lott found an "unusual" decline in Panhandle voter turnout compared to previous elections, and that the networks' early call of Florida for Democrat Al Gore may have depressed Republican turnout in other states where the polls remained open.

Some countries, including the United Kingdom, Italy, France, Germany, India and Singapore, have made it a criminal offence to release exit poll figures before all polling stations have closed.

In some instances, problems with exit polls have encouraged polling groups to pool data in hopes of increased accuracy. This proved successful during the 2005 UK general election, when the BBC and ITV merged their data to show an exit poll giving Labour a majority of 66 seats, which turned out to be the exact figure. This method was also successful in the 2007 Australian federal election, where the collaboration of Sky News, Channel 7 and Auspoll provided an almost exact 53 percent two party-preferred victory to Labor over the ruling Coalition.

There was a widespread controversy during the 2014 Indian general election when the Election Commission of India barred media organisations from displaying exit poll results until the votes had been counted. This was followed by a strong protest from the media which caused the Election Commission to withdraw its statement and confirm that the exit polls can be shown at 6:30 PM on 12 May after the last vote is cast. Since then exit polls (during polling window) are prohibited in India, only post poll opinion surveys are allowed after polling is over.

References

Further reading
 
 Chatterjee, Somdeep, and Jai Kamal. "Voting for the underdog or jumping on the bandwagon? Evidence from India’s exit poll ban." Public Choice (2020): 1-23.
 
 Desilver, Drew. "Just how does the general election exit poll work, anyway?." Pew Research Center (2016). online
 Klima, André, et al. "Combining Aggregate Data and Exit Polls for the Estimation of Voter Transitions." Sociological Methods & Research 48.2 (2019): 296–325. online
 
 Runciman, Carin. "Gendered risks in survey research: reflections from South African exit polls." International Journal of Social Research Methodology (2020): 1–5.
 
 
 Wilks-Heeg, Stuart, and Peter Andersen. "The Only (Other) Poll That Matters? Exit Polls and Election Night Forecasts in BBC General Election Results Broadcasts, 1955–2017." Political Studies (2020) online

External links 
 Edison Research, which conducts the main exit polls in USA
 How to Conduct Exit Polls 

Types of polling
Elections